Bangladesh has competed at eight Commonwealth Games, with the first coming in 1978. They did not compete again until 1990, but have competed in every Games since. Bangladesh has won eight Commonwealth Games medals, all coming in shooting events.

Medals

List of Medalists
Bangladesh's most successful medallist at the Commonwealth Games was Asif Hossain Khan who earned himself one gold, one silver and one bronze. He also shares the most Commonwealth Games medals for Bangladesh with Abdullah Hel Baki with three medals each.

Medals by sport
Bangladesh has so far only achieved medals from the Shooting event.

References

 
Nations at the Commonwealth Games